Tatyana Vladimirovna Bakalchuk (born on 16 October 1975) is a Russian entrepreneur, founder and CEO of Wildberries,  the largest Russian online retailer, and the country's first self-made woman billionaire. As of October 2021, her net worth was estimated at US$13.3 billion.

Early life

Tatiana Bakalchuk was born on October 16, 1975 in a Koryo-saram family. She finished school in Moscow oblast and graduated from Kolomna University. She planned to move to Moscow and continue her education as a designer. Still, she had to abandon that plan and return to teaching English when the 1998 financial crisis struck Russia.

In the early 2000s, she met her future husband Vladislav Bakalchuk, an entrepreneur and a founder of Utech ISP. In 2004, after giving birth to her first child, Bakalchuk launched Wildberries, which initially focused on reselling apparel from Otto and Quelle catalogs.

Career

By 2006, Wildberries got an office in Milkovo, Moscow region, a team of couriers, phone operators, and an IT crew. By that time, the company started to sell apparel by small local European brands and the excess stock of old collections of well-known brands. Wildberries was among the first Russian e-commerce companies to offer a flat delivery rate and free try-on and to build a network of pick-up points with fitting rooms. By 2020, the company operated over 7,000 pick-up points.

During the 2014—2016 financial crisis, Wildberries switched to a platform business model (the one employed by Amazon). The company benefited from the dramatic increase in online orders during the COVID-19 pandemic (starting in 2020).

Tatiana and Vladislav Bakalchuk own Wildberries. By 2022, according to a Data Insight report, Wildberries was the largest e-store in Russia. In 2019, the company's value was estimated at $1 billion, which made Bakalchuk the second woman in Russia to become a billionaire, and by 2020, she became the wealthiest woman in Russia, worth $1.4 billion. Forbes US edition praised Bakalchuk as one of the most notable new billionaires. By 2021, her fortune grew by 800% (compared to 2020) to $13 billion.

From 2021 to 2022 Bakalchuk was the member of the Supervisory Board of VTB Bank. In December 2021, she joined the All-Russia People's Front. In 2021, the government of Ukraine imposed sanctions over Tatyana and Vladislav Bakalchuk and Wildberries for selling Russian military uniforms and anti-Ukrainian literature.

Personal life
She is married to Vladislav Bakalchuk, they have four children, and live in Moscow.

References

External links 
 Tatyana Bakalchuk (Bloomberg profile)

Koryo-saram
21st-century Russian businesswomen
21st-century Russian businesspeople
Female billionaires
Russian billionaires
1975 births
Living people
Russian people of Korean descent